Oskar Wikberg (born August 20, 1994) is a Swedish tennis player.

Career
Wikberg was a talented youth player. He had a constant presence in the Swedish juniors top-10. He won the Swedish National Championships in singles U-18. 

Wikberg played college tennis at the University of Wisconsin and later transferred to UC Berkeley. He compiled a college record of 82 wins and 46 losses.

Wikberg has one ITF title which he won in Vietnam. He has reached the quarterfinals in two ITF 10,000 Futures tournaments.

Personal life
Wikberg is from Täby, Sweden. His sister, Hanna, is also a professional tennis player, who played college tennis at Penn State. His uncle is American advertising executive Jerry Reitman.

References

1993 births
Living people
Swedish male tennis players
Tennis players from Stockholm
California Golden Bears men's tennis players